Sukhram Oraon is an Indian politician and an MLA elected from Chakradharpur constituency of Jharkhand state as a member of Jharkhand Mukti Morcha in 2005 and 2019 Jharkhand Legislative election.

He defeated BJP state president and former MP Laxman Giluwa by a margin of 12,334 votes in the 2019 election. This is the second time Oraon defeated Laxman Giluwa.

References

Living people
21st-century Indian politicians
Lok Sabha members from Jharkhand
People from Jharkhand
Date of birth missing (living people)
Place of birth missing (living people)
Year of birth missing (living people)